Brian Purcell (23 November 1938 – 20 January 1969) was a Welsh professional footballer who played for Swansea City between 1959 and 1968, making 165 league appearances. Purcell also played for Waun Wen and Hereford United. Purcell died in a car-crash on 20 January 1969, alongside Roy Evans.

References

External links

1938 births
1969 deaths
Footballers from Swansea
Welsh footballers
Swansea City A.F.C. players
Hereford United F.C. players
Road incident deaths in England
Southern Football League players
Association football defenders